Simon Swynfen Jervis  (born 9 January 1943) is a British museum director and art historian. His first museum post was at what is now known as Leicester Museum and Art Gallery in 1964, later joining the Department of Furniture at the Victoria and Albert Museum, London, in 1966. He was Director of the Fitzwilliam Museum, Cambridge, from 1990 to 1995, and Historic Buildings Secretary of the National Trust from 1995 to 2002.

He served as president of the Society of Antiquaries of London from 1995 to 2001. In 2021 he was elected president of the Furniture History Society.

References

Publications (incomplete) 
 Jervis, Simon Swynfen. British and Irish Inventories: A list and bibliography of published transcriptions of secular inventories. Leeds, Furniture History Society, 2010  
 Jervis, Simon Swynfen. The Facts on File Dictionary of Design and Designers. New York, Facts on File, 1984  
 Jervis, Simon Swynfen. High Victorian Design. Woodbridge, Boydell, 1983  
 Jervis, Simon Swynfen. John Stafford of Bath and his Interior Decorations. Haywards Heath, Furniture History Society, 2009  
 Jervis, Simon Swynfen. The Penguin Dictionary of Design and Designers. Harmondsworth, Penguin Books, 1984  
 Jervis, Simon Swynfen. Printed Furniture Designs before 1650. Leeds, W. S. Maney & Sons Ltd for the Furniture History Society, 1974  
 Jervis, Simon Swynfen. Victorian Furniture. London, Sydney, Ward Lock, 1968  
 Jervis, Simon Swynfen (editor and translator). A Rare Treatise on Interior Decoration and Architecture: Joseph Friedrich zu Racknitz's Presentation and History of the Taste of the Leading Nations. Los Angeles, Getty Research Institute, 2019  
 Jervis, Simon Swynfen, and Dudley Dodd. Roman Splendour, English Arcadia: The English taste for Pietre Dure and the Sixtus cabinet at Stourhead. London, Philip Wilson, 2015  

1943 births
Living people
Directors of museums in the United Kingdom
Fellows of the Society of Antiquaries of London
Presidents of the Society of Antiquaries of London